Kaathuvaakula Rendu Kaadhal is an 2022 Indian Tamil-language romantic comedy film written and directed by Vignesh Shivan. It stars Vijay Sethupathi, Nayanthara and Samantha. The soundtrack album and film score were composed by Anirudh Ravichander. In the film, The life of Rambo, an unlucky man, changes when he finds love. However, the only problem is, instead of one, he falls in love with two women. The rest of story deals with how Rambo comes out of this tricky situation and with whom he finally gets settled.

Kaathuvaakula Rendu Kaadhal was released theatrically on 28 April 2022. It received mixed from critics and audience, who praised the main cast's performance (particularly those of Vijay Sethupathi, Samantha and Nayanthara), background score and soundtrack but criticized the screenplay, climax and length.

Plot 
Prabhu is the host of a television show called Real Or Reel. There, he interviews two women: Kanmani Ganguly and Khatija Begum. Both are very much in love with Ranjankudi Anbarasu Murugesa Boopathy Ohondhiran aka Rambo, who also loves them back.

In the flashback, Rambo hails from a village that believed his family was cursed. Whoever married in his family would die. Rambo's father decides to break the myth and marries a local teacher named Minah Kaif, while his brothers and sister remained unmarried. Rambo's father is overjoyed after the birth of his son, whom he names Ranjankudi Anbarasu Murugesa Boopathy Ohondhiran (Rambo). Unfortunately, while announcing his son's birth, he accidentally slips from a tower and dies. His wife Minah suffers a stroke shortly after and is paralyzed. Rambo's uncles and aunts, and the whole village believe that the birth of Rambo has brought bad luck that his father tried so hard to fight. Rambo grows up believing that he emanates bad luck wherever he goes. When his mother suffers a seizure in his presence, he runs away from the village for good, believing that his proximity to his mother makes her ill. He goes to the city and lives far away from his family, but continues to have contact with them.

Years later, Rambo takes up two jobs to earn a living. During the daytime, he works as a cab driver. At night, he works as a bouncer at a pub. He meets Khatija at the bar every evening and the two develop a friendship. Rambo notices Khatija's violent boyfriend: Mohammed Mobi, who slaps her one night, so he intervenes and fights Mobi. Khatija breaks up with Mobi and starts hanging out with Rambo every evening. On the other hand, Kanmani works as a saleswoman and raises her younger sister Minmini and differently-abled brother Bhargav. She attempts to find a husband who would allow her to live with her siblings even after marriage, but in vain. Rambo works as her cab driver during the day and the two develop a mutual attraction. Days go by and the two women fall for Rambo and propose to him on the same day. Though Rambo is surprised that two fabulous women have fallen for him, he is quick to realize that only their love has turned his bad luck around for good, so he accepts both of their proposals.

Not knowing how to proceed with his double love life, he gets help from Prabhu, a reality show host, who makes Rambo concoct a story that he has a memory disorder that makes him forget events that happened during the day and night alternately. The staging is a disaster when Rambo reveals that he has memory of both the women and is equally in love with both, it is up to them to sacrifice their love for the other person. Kanmani and Khatija refuse to do so and stand by their decision to marry Rambo. The three move in together, and though both women dislike each other at first, after the unexpected death of Khatija's father, they strike a friendship. After a point, the two find out that Rambo staged the show and kick him out of the house. Rambo's friend asks them to travel to the village one last time to see Rambo's mother who is seriously ill. Rambo decides not to go back as he fears his presence could worsen her condition. He is forced to go and his mother miraculously recovers, now the villagers believe Rambo's presence gives out good luck. They beg both Khatija and Kanmani to marry Rambo so the family's curse could be broken and all his uncles and aunt can be married. They finally agree and host a wedding ceremony for not only Rambo, but also his entire family.

Shortly after the rest of the family is married, Khatija and Kanmani walk out of the wedding, each sacrificing their love so the other person can marry Rambo. A year later, the three still meet with Rambo saying that their relationship was enough to break the curse. After the two women leave, Rambo shocks his neighbour and tells that Katrina Kaif has started chatting with him as his new girlfriend. Rambo throws his phone and leaves, leaving an unaware Katrina waiting for him online.

Cast

Production

Development 
After the success of Naanum Rowdy Dhaan (2015), Vignesh Shivan had planned a script for a triangular romantic film starring Sivakarthikeyan in the lead role, with actresses Trisha and Nayanthara under consideration for the female leads. Later in 2016, Vignesh had announced that Vijay Sethupathi will play the lead role in his film, titled as Kaathuvaakula Rendu Kaadhal; Anirudh Ravichander was reported to score the music which marked both Sethupathi and Anirudh's second collaboration with Vignesh after Naanum Rowdy Dhaan. Produced by A. M. Rathnam, the shooting of the film was supposed to go on floors in August 2016, until Vignesh decided to remake the Hindi-language film Special 26 (2013) for his new project, the Suriya-starrer Thaanaa Serndha Koottam (2018) and also to work with Sivakarthikeyan for another film produced by Lyca Productions, which came under the tentative title #SK17.

With #SK17 becoming shelved, Vignesh decided to revisit the script with the same cast and crew members. During the occasion of Valentine's Day (14 February 2020), Vignesh announced the film officially under the same title Kaathuvaakula Rendu Kaadhal, reporting that he will produce the film under his own banner Rowdy Pictures along with Lalit Kumar of Seven Screen Studios. Nayanthara and Samantha were officially announced as the female leads. It was touted to be a love triangle story.

Casting 
The film was initially announced with Nayanthara and Trisha starring. However, due to Trisha's exit from the project citing scheduling conflicts, Samantha Ruth Prabhu was later announced as the female lead in February 2020. This film marked the third collaboration of Vijay Sethupathi and Nayanthara after Vignesh's Naanum Rowdy Dhaan (2015) and Imaikkaa Nodigal (2018), where Sethupathi appeared in a cameo role, and his second collaboration with Samantha after Super Deluxe (2019). Anirudh Ravichander was announced as the music director, after regularly collaborated with Vignesh, since Naanum Rowdy Dhaan. Vijay Kartik Kannan, who was initially announced as the cinematographer left the project after completing two schedules of the film, due to date clashes and was replaced by S. R. Kathir. The film marked the debut of Shweta Sabu Cyril (daughter of veteran art director Sabu Cyril), who joined the film's team as the production designer.

Vignesh Shivan announced through his Instagram on 21 March 2021 (World Down Syndrome Day), that, 15-year old Bhargav, who is affected by Down syndrome, will be joining the team as one of the pivotal role. While the makers were tightlipped about the recurring cast members, in October 2021, it was announced that dance choreographer Kala Master will make her acting debut with the film, being a part of the film's supporting cast. In November 2021, veteran actor Prabhu announced that he will play an important role in the film, and Indian cricketer S. Sreesanth, Redin Kingsley and Lollu Sabha Maran, confirmed their presence in the project. In the first look released on 15 November, Vignesh revealed the names of the lead characters as Rambo, Kanmani and Khatija respectively.

Filming 
Principal photography was supposed to take place in April 2020 but was delayed due to the COVID-19 lockdown in India. In May 2020, the production house announced that filming would begin that August. However, on 10 December 2020, the team officially kickstarted the film on floors in Chennai, with principal photography from 14 December followed by Vijay Sethupathi's arrival in Hyderabad. After the film's first schedule completed within a month, Samantha Ruth Prabhu officially joined the film's sets from January 2021 in Chennai as a part of their second schedule. On 10 February 2021, Vignesh announced that the shooting of the second schedule wrapped.

The third schedule began during March 2021 at Chennai, before filming was delayed due to the second wave of COVID-19. Shooting resumed in Pondicherry in August 2021. On 23 August 2021, a video from the shooting spot was surfaced into the internet. It had the lead actors recreating the song "Valai Osai" from Sathyaa (1988), where the actors also wore costumes similar to that song. With more than 90% of the film's shooting being completed, the makers began post-production activities for the film, with dubbing works beginning during early-December 2021. On 7 December, Vignesh kickstarted the final schedule of the film in Mysore. The shooting was wrapped up on 31 March 2022.

Music

The film's seven-song soundtrack were composed by Anirudh Ravichander in his third collaboration with Vignesh as a director, after Naanum Rowdy Dhaan (2015) and Thaanaa Serndha Koottam (2018). It is also Anirudh's 25th film as a composer. With the duo's plans of releasing singles occasionally on Valentine's Day, the makers released the song "Rendu Kaadhal" on 14 February 2021 which revolves around "double love failure and heartbreak". Anirudh sang this song with female vocals accompanied by Shakthisree Gopalan and Aishwarya Suresh Bindra. Indiaglitz praised the first single "Rendu Kaadhal", saying that the orchestration and melancholic moments "brings the mood to life" and the lyrics of Vignesh Shivan "expresses complex feelings in the simplest manner".

Though Vignesh Shivan announced that the second single will be released in July 2021 in an online interaction with fans, the song which was later titled "Two Two Two" was eventually released on 18 September, which coincided the director's birthday. This song also had vocals by Anirudh, along with female singers Sunidhi Chauhan and Sanjana Kalmanje. The track received positive response from music critics and actresses Priyanka Chopra and Katrina Kaif, shared and praised the song through social media.

On 3 January 2022, the third single track "Naan Pizhai" was launched, which had vocals by Ravi G and Shashaa Tirupati. It revolved around the "Kanmani-Rambo" love story. Ravi was approached to sing the track after Anirudh and Vignesh liked one of his cover versions he crooned during the COVID-19 lockdown. In an interview with Srinivasa Ramanujam of The Hindu, Ravi had said that: "What's most heartening is that it is a melody, which itself is a difficult proposition for composers to churn out in this age of fast-paced peppy numbers. The opportunity to explore such melodies in the film music space is scarce. The first time I listened to the track version, I had goosebumps. That it has clicked with audiences is great news for musicians." The track received positive response for Anirudh's melodious composition, and had crossed above 10 million views in YouTube. A rough cut of this track is sung by Anirudh himself.

On 20 April 2022, the fourth single "Dippam Dappam" was released, which had vocals by Anthony Daasan and Anirudh. The track received positive reviews for its upbeat tunes.

Release

Theatrical 
Kaathuvaakula Rendu Kadhal released on 28 April 2022. It was initially slated for a theatrical release in December 2021 but due to delay in post-production, the release was postponed to April. The film was planned for its simultaneous release for its Telugu dubbed version as Kanmani Rambo Khatija but the Telugu version didn't release due to negative reviews.

Distribution 
The Tamil Nadu distribution rights of the film was bought by Red Giant Movies. The Kerala theatrical distribution rights of Kaathuvaakula Rendu Kaadhal has been snapped by Iffaar Media. The film was distributed in the UK and Europe by Ahimsa Entertainment.

Home media 
Star Vijay acquired the satellite rights of the film, while Disney+ Hotstar acquired the digital streaming rights for streaming. The film started streaming on Disney+ Hotstar from 27 May 2022.

Reception

Box office 

Critical response 
The film received mixed reviews. Soundarya Athimuthu of The Quint gave the rating 2.5 out of 5 stating that "The makers have hinted at it quite well because just like how Vijay Sethupathi as Rambo in the film smartly tries to justify cheating on two women at the same time, Director Vignesh Shivan with his quirky comedy, some beautifully placed emotional dialogues and heart touching lyrics also cheekily cheats the audience – making them believe that this is a one of a kind love story while all he did was, reimagine the rom-com genre by twisting the tale of the usual storyline – "two girls fight over a guy". But what feels somewhat good is that the hero is not completely rewarded at the end despite his mistakes as one would anticipate."

Manoj Kumar R of The Indian Express gave the film's rating 2 out of 5 stating that "The latent nature of adult comedy in this movie is a big turn off. This film aims to play into the wild fantasies of a lovelorn man by subtly sexualising the leading ladies. But, it's neither clean humour nor an outright adult comedy. It's a mess. The main reason is Vignesh's indecisiveness. He wants to keep the film safe for people to watch it with family. And at the same time, sprinkle it with just enough double meaning dialogues and scenes so that people get the hint. It also wants to be a combination of director C. S. Amudhan's Thamizh Padam, a spoof film, and Vignesh's 2015 hit Naanum Rowdy Dhaan. You can't have it both ways."

Logesh Balachandran critic from Times of india gave 2.5 stars out of 5 stars and noted that "however manage only to recreate the same in parts.The mere presence of Vijay Sethupathi, Nayanthara and Samantha helps to elevate even ordinary scenes inspite of the sloppy writing. A single-shot scene in which Vijay Sethupathi delivers a lengthy dialogue again showcases the prowess of the actor and how a good actor can make a scene interesting." Srivatsan S from The Hindu noted that "Except for a few scattered laughs, this Vignesh Shivan directorial remains firmly bland despite featuring three brilliant actors"

However, Hindustan Times critic Haricharan Pudipeddi noted that  "The film, nevertheless, is salvaged by decent comedy and Anirudh’s splendid music. Vijay Sethupathi is at his effortless best on screen, and alongside both Nayanthara and Samantha, we get some lovely moments between the trio. The film does feel dragged post interval but by the end, it makes up for the problematic plot." Avinash Ramachandran from Cinema Express gave 2.5 out of rating and said that "For almost half its running time, Kaathuvaakula Rendu Kaadhal explores the idea of a specific type of mental illness. Around halfway point, it seems like the film realises its folly and the makers dodged the ‘wrongful representation’ bullet.'The News Minute critic gave 2.5 stars out of 5 and said that "Vijay Sethupathi has done an admirable job in the role given to him. We only wish that when such a firecracker cast was brought together, the script was fitting for their talent."

Notes

References

External links 
 

2022 films
2022 romantic comedy films
Films scored by Anirudh Ravichander
Indian romance films